Danny O’Flaherty is an Irish balladeer and Celtic folk musician.

Life
O'Flaherty lived in the Aran Islands and the village of Ardmore, Co Galway, in the west of Ireland and immigrated to London in 1967, and shortly thereafter to the United States where he eventually became a professional songwriter and performer.

Career
After moving to the USA in 1969, O'Flaherty performed with a professional folk group known as "The Irish Minstrels," eventually performing around the country.  He was influenced by the performances of Steve Goodman, Tommy Makem, Liam Clancy, and The New Christy Minstrels. O'Flaherty joined with his brother Patrick O'Flaherty to form The Celtic Folk. They performed mostly in Washington, D.C. On October 7, 1979 Danny performed a concert at Catholic University of America for the visit of Pope John Paul II.

In 1989 O'Flaherty and his brother Patrick opened O'Flaherty's Irish Channel Pub in New Orleans. The pub was located at 508 Toulouse Street in the French Quarter.  In 2005 Hurricane Katrina hit the area and the pub closed. Danny evacuated to Texas, where he stayed after the storm. 

O'Flaherty toured mainly as a solo act through first half of 2015, until October 15th when he was involved in an automobile accident in New Orleans. As a result of the injuries sustained, he was unable to perform regularly for 5 years. In August 2018 Danny released his latest album, "It's a Long Way From St. John's."  The album chronicles the Royal Newfoundland Regiment.

In November 2019, Danny performed his first full live show in New Orleans at Esplanade Studios. O'Flaherty returned to touring in March 2020 but the mandated shutdowns resulting from the COVID-19 pandemic ended that tour. In early 2022 Danny O'Flaherty returned to live performances in the southern USA including multiple live shows from Esplanade Studios in New Orleans.

Recordings
Danny O'Flaherty has recorded numerous albums and has had songs featured in major films. He recorded the traditional song, "The Parting Glass," featured in Seeking Justice, a film starring Nicolas Cage.

Discography
Solo Recordings / Albums:
 Every Child’s a Star
 Listen to the Wind
 The History of Ireland in Word and Song
 Heroes
 Farewell to John John
 Remember
 From The Heart
 An Irish Christmas Carol
 Spirit of Freedom
 He Believes in Me
 Secret Garden
 Long Way From St. John’s
 Changes
 Ceol na dTon
 Here Comes The Echo
 The Leprechaun Song (words and music Danny O’Flaherty) A Leprechaun’s St. Patrick’s Day by Sarah Kirwan Blazek  Pelican Publishing/Books-on-Tape, 2000
 Donkey Cart Song Irish Night Before Christmas Pelican Publishing/Books-on-Tape, 2000
 The Monster Picnic (with Khaetidawne Quirke)
 The Blushing Bride (with Noel Nash)
 St. Patrick’s Day Anthem (with Noel Nash)
 Ride the Waves (with The Celtic Folk)
 Rainbow Flight (with The Celtic Folk)
 The Celtic Folk Live Volume I (with The Celtic Folk)
 The Celtic Folk Live Volume II (with The Celtic Folk)
 The Celtic Folk Live Volume III (with The Celtic Folk)
 The Celtic Folk Live Volume IV (with The Celtic Folk)
 Live on Bourbon Street (with The Celtic Folk)
 Looking West (with The Celtic Folk)

Books
The Loch Ness Monster’s Story (with Khaetidawne Quirke) 

Danny O'Flaherty's Tears of Freedom  ISBN 978-1544134024

References 

1951 births
Musicians from County Galway
Living people